Helcogrammoides is a genus of triplefins in the family Tripterygiidae. The species in this genus are found in South America and the Antarctic Peninsula.

Species
 Helcogrammoides antarcticus (Tomo, 1981)
 Helcogrammoides chilensis (Cancino, 1960)
 Cunningham's triplefin, Helcogrammoides cunninghami (Smitt, 1898)

References
 

 
Tripterygiidae